UFC 33: Victory in Vegas  was a mixed martial arts event held by the Ultimate Fighting Championship at the Mandalay Bay Events Center in Las Vegas, Nevada on September 28, 2001. The event was seen live on pay per view in the United States, and later released on home video.

History
The card was headlined by three title bouts, Tito Ortiz vs. Vladimir Matyushenko for the Light Heavyweight Title (Vitor Belfort was unable to fight due to arm injury while training), Dave Menne vs Gil Castillo for the new Middleweight Title and Jens Pulver vs Dennis Hallman for the Lightweight Title.

UFC 33 was the first mixed martial arts event sanctioned by the Nevada State Athletic Commission, under the Unified Rules of Mixed Martial Arts, which were first established by the New Jersey State Athletic Control Board in April 2001.

UFC 33 is commonly pointed to as one of the worst in UFC history, failing to captivate the new pay-per-view audience due to the large number of decisions on the card – UFC 33 was in fact the first event where all main card fights went to a decision. The Ortiz-Matyushenko and Pulver-Hallman fights in particular have been judged the two most uneventful five-round title fights in UFC history, up to at least 2009, by some metrics. Additionally, the broadcast ran over and cut out early on many cable systems (in the middle of the Ortiz-Matyushenko fight). After this event, the UFC reduced the number of live fights to five and didn't schedule an event with 3 title fights for over 15 years.

During the post fight press conference for UFC 111, in response to questions about a perceived boring fight between Georges St-Pierre and Dan Hardy, UFC president Dana White commented that "UFC 33 is the only one I can remember where every fight sucked."

Years later at the UFC 149 post-fight press conference, after a similarly lackluster card, Dana White quipped, "It felt like I was at UFC 33 again".

In 2013, following UFC on Fox 6 post-fight press conference, Dana White once again referenced UFC 33 as "The worst show we've ever had".

Results

See also
 Ultimate Fighting Championship
 List of UFC champions
 List of UFC events
 2001 in UFC

References

External links
 

Ultimate Fighting Championship events
2001 in mixed martial arts
Mixed martial arts in Las Vegas
2001 in sports in Nevada